Peter Ford (born 28 January 1962) is an Irish former sportsperson. He played Gaelic football with Sligo club St Mary's and was a member of the senior Mayo county team in the 1980s and 1990s. Ford later served as manager of the Galway and Sligo teams.

He departed as Galway manager in August 2007.

He has also managed Breaffy.

He is a secondary school teacher.

References

 

1962 births
Living people
Gaelic football backs
Gaelic football managers
Irish schoolteachers
Mayo inter-county Gaelic footballers
St Mary's (Sligo) Gaelic footballers